This is a list of Wii and Wii U video games that support the Wii MotionPlus accessory as input.

Wii

WiiWare

Unreleased
The Grinder, developed by High Voltage Software

Wii U

See also
Kinect games

References

 
Wii games